Copa Internacional Cafam 2009 was a football pre-season international tournament. It was played in Estadio El Campín of Bogotá, Colombia between January 28 and February 1, 2009. In the tournament, there were three teams from Colombia and one from Argentina.

Participating teams 

 Millonarios
 América de Cali
 Atlético Nacional
 Argentinos Juniors

Semi-finals

Third place play-off

Final

References 
Con traje de gala Official Website of Millonaris. 10-12-08.
 Vienen los 'Argentinos' Enlajugada.com. 9-12-08.
Argentinos Juniors, invitado para torneo de pretemporada en Bogotá Futbolred.com 9-12-08.
Argentinos Juniors, Millonarios, Atlético Nacional y América disputarán un cuadrangular amistoso Futbolred.com 9-12-08.

Colombian football friendly trophies
2009 in Colombian football
2008–09 in Argentine football